Pascal Eenkhoorn (born 8 February 1997) is a Dutch cyclist, who currently rides for UCI ProTeam .

Career
Eenkhoorn was born in Genemuiden. In December 2017, he was suspended for 2 months by his team, for possession of sleeping pills during a pre-season training camp – violating the team's internal rules.

In 2022, Eenkhoorn won the Dutch National Road Race Championships.

Major results

2014
 1st  Mountains classification, Course de la Paix Juniors
 2nd Time trial, National Junior Road Championships
 2nd Overall Aubel–Thimister–La Gleize
1st  Young rider classification
 3rd Grand Prix Bati-Metallo
 5th Overall Le Trophée Centre Morbihan
2015
 1st La Bernaudeau Junior
 1st Grand Prix André Noyelle
 National Junior Road Championships
2nd Road race
2nd Time trial
 2nd Paris–Roubaix Juniors
 5th Overall Niedersachsen Rundfahrt der Junioren
 8th Overall Grand Prix Rüebliland
 9th Trofeo comune di Vertova Memorial Pietro Merelli
2016
 2nd Time trial, National Under-23 Road Championships
 5th Overall Tour de Berlin
1st  Young rider classification
1st Prologue
2017
 1st  Overall Olympia's Tour
1st  Young rider classification
1st Prologue
 National Under-23 Road Championships 
2nd Time trial
5th Road race
 2nd Overall Rhône-Alpes Isère Tour
1st  Young rider classification
 8th Overall Tour de Normandie
1st  Young rider classification
2018
 1st Stage 1a Settimana Internazionale di Coppi e Bartali
 1st Stage 3 Colorado Classic
 10th Overall Tour of Britain
1st Stage 5 (TTT)
2019
 7th Road race, UCI Road World Under-23 Championships
2020
 4th Road race, National Road Championships
 6th Overall Settimana Internazionale di Coppi e Bartali
1st Stage 4
 8th Overall Czech Cycling Tour
2021
 1st Heistse Pijl
 5th Overall Tour de Wallonie
 10th Overall Tour de Pologne
2022
 1st  Road race, National Road Championships
2023
 7th Vuelta a Murcia

Grand Tour general classification results timeline

Major championships timeline

References

External links

1997 births
Living people
Dutch male cyclists
People from Zwartewaterland
Cyclists from Overijssel